Dicky Monteith is a 1922 British silent drama film directed by Kenelm Foss and starring Stewart Rome, Joan Morgan and Jack Minister. Its plot involves a lawyer who tries to con a drunken client out of a large sum of money. It is an adaptation of a play by Tom Gallon and Leon M. Lion.

Cast
 Stewart Rome as Dicky Monteith
 Joan Morgan as Sally/Dorothy Weston
 Jack Minister as Vincent Hepburn
 Douglas Munro as– Mayor
 Nelson Ramsey as Barty
 Jack Frost as Ginger
 Gertrude Sterroll as– Miss Tillotson
 David Hallett as Gilbert Collingwood
 James English as Sydney Carton
 Fay Segel as Lucy Manette
 A.B. Imeson as Charles Darnay
 Lewis Gilbert as Defarge
 Irene Tripod as Madame Defarge
 Kenelm Foss as Charles Dickens

References

External links

1922 films
1922 drama films
British films based on plays
Films directed by Kenelm Foss
British drama films
British silent feature films
British black-and-white films
1920s English-language films
1920s British films
Silent drama films